Paul McPhillips (born 27 March 1971) is a Scottish former professional snooker player. He is best known as the regular practice partner of Stephen Hendry.

Amateur career
McPhillips was the UK Junior Champion in 1987. In 1990, he was defeated by Alan McManus in the final of the Scottish Amateur Championship.

Pro career
McPhillips turned Pro in 1991. In the 1992 Classic he reached the last 32 by defeating former world champion Joe Johnson. He defeated Ronnie O'Sullivan to reach the Last 16 of the 1994 Welsh Open but was beaten by Steve Davis and he also finished runners up to Matthew Stevens at the 1995 Benson & Hedges Championship in Edinburgh, he reached no. 59 in the Snooker world rankings 1994/1995 as a result. At the 1997 British Open, he reached the last 16 but was narrowly defeated by Stephen Hendry.
During the 1997/98 season, he defeated Michael Holt 6–5 to win the 1st event, in Event 4 he reached the last 16 and at Event 5 he reached the Quarter Final to claim the overall UK Tour.

He had another notable victory in 3rd Qualifying round of the 2001 Embassy World Snooker Championship against Tony Jones.

In the later stages of his career he reached the preliminary round at the 2011 Scottish Professional Championship. and at the 2015 World Seniors Championship he was defeated in the quarter finals by John Parrott.

Career finals

Non-ranking finals: 2 (1 title)

Amateur finals: 1

Results
1989WPBSA Pro Ticket Series - Event 3 - Quarter Final
1991 Benson & Hedges Championship Satellite Championship - last 16
1992 Welsh Open last 64
1992 Classic (snooker) last 32
1993 Welsh Open last 64
1993 European Open (1992/1993) last 64
1994 British Open last 64
1994 Grand Prix (snooker) last 64
1995 International Open last 64
1995 Welsh Open last 64
1996 Grand Prix (snooker) last 32
1997 WPBSA Qualifying School - Event 2 - last 32
1997 WPBSA Qualifying School - Event 3 - last 32
1997 International Open last 64
1998 UK Tour - Event 2 - 32
1998 UK Tour - Event 5 - Quarter Final
1998 UK Tour - Event 4 - last 16
2000 Grand Prix (snooker) last 48
2001 Challenge Tour (snooker) - Event 2 -last 16
2001 Challenge Tour (snooker) - Event 1 -last 16
2002 Challenge Tour (snooker) - Event 3 -last 32
2002 Challenge Tour (snooker) - Event 4 -last 32

Related Article

Player Stats

References

Scottish snooker players
1971 births
Living people
Sportspeople from Glasgow